A Christian denomination is a distinct religious body within Christianity, identified by traits such as a name, organization and doctrine. Individual bodies, however, may use alternative terms to describe themselves, such as church, convention, communion, assembly, house, union, network, or sometimes fellowship. Divisions between one denomination and another are primarily defined by authority and doctrine. Issues regarding the nature of Jesus, Trinitarianism, salvation, the authority of apostolic succession, eschatology, conciliarity, papal supremacy and papal primacy among others may separate one denomination from another. Groups of denominations, often sharing broadly similar beliefs, practices, and historical ties—can be known as "branches of Christianity" or "denominational families" (e.g. Eastern or Western Christianity and their sub-branches). These "denominational families" are often imprecisely also called denominations.  

Christian denominations since the 20th century have often involved themselves in ecumenism. Ecumenism refers to efforts among Christian bodies to develop better understandings and closer relationships. It also refers to efforts toward visible unity in the Christian Church, though the terms of visible unity vary for each denomination of Christianity; the Roman Catholic Church and Eastern Orthodox Church each teach visible unity may only be achieved by converting to their denominational beliefs and structure, citing claims of being the one true church. The largest ecumenical organization in Christianity is the World Council of Churches.

The following is not a complete list, but aims to provide a comprehensible overview of the diversity among denominations of Christianity, ecumenical organizations, and Christian ideologies not necessarily represented by specific denominations. Only those Christian denominations, ideologies and organizations with Wikipedia articles will be listed in order to ensure that all entries on this list are notable and verifiable. The denominations and ecumenical organizations listed are generally ordered from ancient to contemporary Christianity.

Terminology and qualification

Some bodies included on this list do not consider themselves denominations. For example, the Catholic Church considers itself the one true church and the Holy See as pre-denominational. The Eastern Orthodox Church also considers itself the original Christian church and pre-denominational. To express further the complexity involved, the Roman Catholic and Eastern Orthodox churches were historically one and the same, as evidenced by the fact that they are the only two modern churches in existence to accept all of the first seven ecumenical councils, until differences arose, such as papal authority and dominance, the rise of the Ecumenical Patriarchate of Constantinople, the fall of the Western Roman Empire, the continuance of emperors in the Eastern Roman Empire, and the final and permanent split that occurred during the Crusades with the siege of Constantinople. This also illustrates that denominations can arise not only from religious or theological issues, but political and generational divisions as well.

Other churches that are viewed by non-adherents as denominational are highly decentralized and do not have any formal denominational structure, authority, or record-keeping beyond the local congregation; several groups within the Restoration movement and congregational churches fall into this category.

Some Christian bodies are large (e.g. Catholics, Orthodox, Pentecostals and non/inter-denominationals, Anglicans or Baptists), while others are just a few small churches, and in most cases the relative size is not evident in this list except for the denominational group or movement as a whole (e.g. Church of the East, Oriental Orthodox Churches, or Lutheranism). The largest denomination is the Catholic Church with more than 1.3 billion members. The smallest of these groups may have only a few dozen adherents or an unspecified number of participants in independent churches as described below. As such, specific numbers and a certain size may not define a group as a denomination. However, as a general rule, the larger a group becomes, the more acceptance and legitimacy it gains.

Modern movements such as Christian fundamentalism, Pietism, Evangelicalism, the Holiness movement and Pentecostalism sometimes cross denominational lines, or in some cases create new denominations out of two or more continuing groups (as is the case for many united and uniting churches, for example; e.g. the United Church of Christ). Such subtleties and complexities are not clearly depicted here.

Between denominations, theologians, and comparative religionists there are considerable disagreements about which groups can be properly called Christian or a Christian denomination as disagreements arise primarily from doctrinal differences between each other. As an example, this list contains groups also known as "rites" which many, such as the Roman Catholic Church, would say are not denominations as they are in full papal communion, and thus part of the Catholic Church. For the purpose of simplicity, this list is intended to reflect the self-understanding of each denomination. Explanations of different opinions concerning their status as Christian denominations can be found at their respective articles.

There is no official recognition in most parts of the world for religious bodies, and there is no official clearinghouse which could determine the status or respectability of religious bodies. Often there is considerable disagreement between various groups about whether others should be labeled with pejorative terms such as "cult", or about whether this or that group enjoys some measure of respectability. Such considerations often vary from place to place, or culture to culture, where one denomination may enjoy majority status in one region, but be widely regarded as a "dangerous cult" in another part of the world. Inclusion on this list does not indicate any judgment about the size, importance, or character of a group or its members.

Early Christian

Early Christianity is often divided into three different branches that differ in theology and traditions, which all appeared in the 1st century AD/CE. They include Jewish Christianity, Pauline Christianity and Gnostic Christianity. All modern Christian denominations are said to have descended from the Jewish and Pauline Christianities, with Gnostic Christianity dying, or being hunted out of existence after the early Christian era and being largely forgotten until discoveries made in the late 19th and early twentieth centuries. There are also other theories on the origin of Christianity.

The following Christian groups appeared between the beginning of the Christian religion and the First Council of Nicaea in 325.

 Adamites
 Arianism
 Ebionites
 Elcesaites
 Marcionism
 Montanism
 Nazarenes
 Novatianism

Unlike the previously mentioned groups, the following are all considered to be related to Christian Gnosticism.

Late ancient and Medieval Christian

The following are groups of Christians appearing between the First Council of Nicaea, the East-West Schism and proto-Protestantism.

 Agonoclita
 Apostolic Brethren
 Arnoldists
 Beguines and Beghards
 Bogomilism
 Patarines
 Bosnian Church
 Brethren of the Free Spirit
 Catharism
 Donatism
 Dulcinians
 Friends of God
 Henricans
 Lollardy
 Neo-Adamites
 Paulicianism
 Petrobrusians
 Skhariya the Jew's sect
 Strigolniki
 Tondrakians

Church of the East 

The Church of the East split from the Roman-recognized state church of Rome during the Sasanian Period. It is also called the Nestorian Church or the Church of Persia. Declaring itself separate from the state church in 424–427, liturgically, it adhered to the East Syriac Rite. Theologically, it adopted the dyophysite doctrine of Nestorianism, which emphasizes the separateness of the divine and human natures of Jesus, and addresses Mary as Christotokos instead of Theotokos; the Church of the East also largely practiced aniconism. Adhered to by groups such as the Keraites and Naimans (see Christianity among the Mongols), the Church of the East had a prominent presence in Inner Asia between the 11th and 14th centuries, but by the 15th century was largely confined to the Eastern Aramaic-speaking Assyrian communities of northern Mesopotamia, in and around the rough triangle formed by Mosul and Lakes Van and Urmia—the same general region where the Church of the East had first emerged between the 1st and 3rd centuries.

Its patriarchal lines divided in a tumultuous period from the 16th-19th century, finally consolidated into the Eastern Catholic Chaldean Church (in full communion with the Pope of Rome), and the Assyrian Church of the East. Other minor, modern related splinter groups include the Ancient Church of the East (split 1968 due of rejecting some changes made by Patriarch Shimun XXI Eshai) and the Chaldean Syrian Church. In 1995 the Chaldean Syrian Church reunified with the Assyrian Church of the East as an archbishopric. The Chaldean Syrian Church is headquartered in Thrissur, India. Together, the Assyrian, Ancient, Chaldean Syrian and Chaldean Catholic Church comprised over 1.6 million in 2018.

Assyrian Christianity 

Assyrian Christianity comprises those Eastern churches who kept the traditional Nestorian christology and ecclesiology of the historical Church of the East after the original church reunited with the Catholic Church in Rome, forming the Chaldean Catholic Church in 1552. Assyrian Christianity forms part of the Syriac Christian tradition. The Assyrian Church of the East and the Ancient Church of the East together had over 0.6 million members .

 Assyrian Church of the East
 Chaldean Syrian Church
 Ancient Church of the East

Oriental Orthodox Churches 

 
The Oriental Orthodox Churches are the Christian churches adhering to Miaphysite christology and theology, with a combined global membership of 62 million . These churches reject the Council of Chalcedon in 451 and those after it. They departed from the state church of the Roman Empire after the Chalcedonian Council. Other denominations, such as the Eastern Orthodox Church and bodies in Old and True Orthodoxy, often label the Oriental Orthodox Churches as "Monophysite"; as the Oriental Orthodox do not adhere to the teachings of Eutyches, they themselves reject this label, preferring the term "Miaphysite". Historically, the Oriental Orthodox Churches considered themselves collectively to be the one, holy, catholic and apostolic Church that Jesus founded. Some Christian denominations have recently considered the body of Oriental Orthodoxy to be a part of the one, holy, catholic and apostolic Church, a view which is gaining increasing acceptance in the wake of ecumenical dialogues between groups such as Eastern Orthodoxy, Roman and Eastern Catholicism, and Protestant Christianity. Most member churches of the Oriental Orthodox Churches are part of the World Council of Churches.
 Armenian Apostolic Church
 Mother See of Holy Etchmiadzin
 Holy See of Cilicia
 Armenian Patriarchate of Constantinople
 Armenian Patriarchate of Jerusalem
 Coptic Orthodox Church
 French Coptic Orthodox Church
 Eritrean Orthodox Tewahedo Church
 Ethiopian Orthodox Tewahedo Church
 Malankara Orthodox Syrian Church
 Brahmavar (Goan) Orthodox Church
 Syriac Orthodox Church of Antioch
 Jacobite Syrian Christian Church

Eastern Orthodox

The Eastern Orthodox Church, officially the Orthodox Catholic Church, claims continuity (based upon apostolic succession) with the early Church as part of the state church of Rome. Though it considers itself pre-denominational, being the original Church of Christ before 1054, some scholars suggest the Eastern Orthodox and Catholic churches began after the East–West Schism. The Eastern Orthodox Church had about 230 million members , making it the second largest single denomination behind the Catholic Church. Some of them have a disputed administrative status (i.e. their autonomy or autocephaly is not recognized universally). Eastern Orthodox churches by and large remain in communion with one another, although this has broken at times throughout its history. Two examples of impaired communion between the Orthodox churches include the Moscow–Constantinople schisms of 1996 and 2018.

 Ecumenical Patriarchate of Constantinople
 Greek Orthodox Archdiocese of Italy and Malta
 Greek Orthodox Archdiocese of America
 Albanian Orthodox Diocese of America
 Greek Orthodox Archdiocese of Canada
 Greek Orthodox Archdiocese of Great Britain
 Greek Orthodox Archdiocese of Australia
 Vicariate for Palestine and Jordan in the USA
 Finnish Orthodox Church
 Greek Orthodox Church of Crete
 Monastic Community of Mount Athos
 Korean Orthodox Church
 Estonian Apostolic Orthodox Church
 Ukrainian Orthodox Church of the USA
 Ukrainian Orthodox Church of Canada
 Orthodox Metropolitanate of Hong Kong
 Exarchate of the Philippines
 Orthodox Metropolitanate of Singapore
 American Carpatho-Russian Orthodox Diocese
 Greek Orthodox Church of Alexandria
 Greek Orthodox Church of Antioch
 Antiochian Orthodox Archdiocese of North America
 Antiochian Orthodox Archdiocese of Australia
 Antiochian Orthodox Archdiocese of Mexico
 Antiochian Orthodox Mission in the Philippines
 Antiochian Orthodox Archdiocese of Chile
 Greek Orthodox Church of Jerusalem
 Greek Orthodox Church of Sinai
 Russian Orthodox Church
 Russian Orthodox Church Outside Russia
 Russian Orthodox Church in Finland
 Japanese Orthodox Church
 Chinese Orthodox Church
 Estonian Orthodox Church (Moscow Patriarchate)
 Moldovan Orthodox Church
 Belarusian Orthodox Church
 Philippine Orthodox Church (Moscow Patriarchate)
 Patriarchal Exarchate in South-East Asia
 Patriarchal Exarchate in Western Europe
 Patriarchal Parishes in the USA
 Patriarchal Parishes in Canada
 Georgian Orthodox and Apostolic Church
 Serbian Orthodox Church
 Serbian Orthodox Ohrid Archbishopric
 Archdiocese of Belgrade and Karlovci
 Serbian Metropolitanate of Skopje
 Serbian Metropolitanate of Dabar
 Serbian Metropolitanate of Montenegro
 Serbian Metropolitanate of Zagreb
 Serbian Metropolitanate of Australia
 Romanian Orthodox Church
 Romanian Metropolis of Bessarabia
 Romanian Metropolia of the Americas
 Bulgarian Orthodox Church
 Diocese of North America and Australia
 Cypriot Orthodox Church
 Orthodox Church of Greece
 Albanian Orthodox Church
 Polish Orthodox Church
 Czech and Slovak Orthodox Church
 Orthodox Church in America
 Archdiocese of Canada
 Romanian Orthodox Episcopate of America
 Albanian Orthodox Archdiocese in America
 Exarchate of Mexico
 Orthodox Church of Ukraine
 Macedonian Orthodox Church

Catholic

The Catholic Church, or Roman Catholic Church, is composed of 24 autonomous sui iuris particular churches: the Latin Church and the 23 Eastern Catholic Churches. It considers itself the one, holy, catholic and apostolic Church that Christ founded, and which Saint Peter initiated along with the missionary work of Saint Paul and others. As such, the Catholic Church does not consider itself a denomination, but rather considers itself pre-denominational, the original Church of Christ. Continuity is claimed based upon apostolic succession with the early Church. The Catholic population exceeds 1.3 billion .

Latin Church (Western Church)

The Latin (or Western) Church is the largest and most widely known of the 24 sui iuris churches that together make up the Catholic Church (not to be confused with the Roman Rite, which is one of the Latin liturgical rites, not a particular church). It is headed by the Bishop of Rome—the Pope, traditionally called the Patriarch of the West—with headquarters in Vatican City, enclaved within Rome, Italy. , the Latin Church comprised 1.255 billion members.

Eastern Catholic Churches

All of the following are particular churches of the Catholic Church. They are all in communion with the Pope as Bishop of Rome and acknowledge his claim of universal jurisdiction and authority. They have some minor distinct theological emphases and expressions (for instance, in the case of those that are of Greek/Byzantine tradition, concerning some non-doctrinal aspects of the Latin view of Purgatory and clerical celibacy). The Eastern Catholic Churches and the Latin Church (which are united in the worldwide Catholic Church) share the same doctrine and sacraments, and thus the same faith. The total membership of the churches accounted for approximately 18 million members .

Alexandrian Rite

 Coptic Catholic Church
 Eritrean Catholic Church
 Ethiopian Catholic Church

Armenian Rite

 Armenian Catholic Church

Byzantine Rite

 Albanian Greek Catholic Church
 Belarusian Greek Catholic Church
 Bulgarian Greek Catholic Church
 Greek Catholic Church of Croatia and Serbia
 Greek Byzantine Catholic Church
 Hungarian Greek Catholic Church
 Italo-Albanian Catholic Church 
 Macedonian Greek Catholic Church
 Melkite Greek Catholic Church
 Romanian Greek Catholic Church
 Russian Greek Catholic Church
 Ruthenian Greek/Byzantine Catholic Church
 Slovak Greek Catholic Church
 Ukrainian Greek Catholic Church

East Syriac Rite

 Chaldean Catholic Church
 Syro-Malabar Catholic Church

West Syriac Rite

 Maronite Church
 Syriac Catholic Church
 Syro-Malankara Catholic Church

Protestant

Protestantism is a movement within Christianity which owes its name to the 1529 Protestation at Speyer, but originated in 1517 when Martin Luther began his dispute with the Roman Catholic Church. This period of time, known as the Reformation, began a series of events resulting over the next 500 years in several newly denominated churches (listed below). Some denominations were started by intentionally dividing themselves from the Roman Catholic Church, such as in the case of the English Reformation while others, such as with Luther's followers, were excommunicated after attempting reform. New denominations and organizations formed through further divisions within Protestant churches since the Reformation began. A denomination labeled "Protestant" subscribes to the fundamental Protestant principles—though not always—that is scripture alone, justification by faith alone, and the universal priesthood of believers.

The majority of contemporary Protestants are members of Adventism, Anglicanism, the Baptist churches, Calvinism (Reformed Protestantism), Lutheranism, Methodism and Pentecostalism. Nondenominational, Evangelical, charismatic, neo-charismatic, independent, Convergence, and other churches are on the rise, and constitute a significant part of Protestant Christianity.

This list gives only an overview, and certainly does not mention all of the Protestant denominations. The exact number of Protestant denominations, including the members of the denominations, is difficult to calculate and depends on definition. A group that fits the generally accepted definition of "Protestant" might not officially use the term. Therefore, it should be taken with caution. The most accepted figure among various authors and scholars includes around 900 million to a little over 1 billion Protestant Christians.

Proto-Protestant

Proto-Protestantism refers to movements similar to the Protestant Reformation, but before 1517, when Martin Luther (1483–1546) is reputed to have nailed the Ninety-Five-Theses to the church door. Major early Reformers were Peter Waldo (c. 1140–c. 1205), John Wycliffe (1320s–1384), and Jan Hus (c. 1369–1415). It is not completely correct to call these groups Protestant due to the fact that some of them had nothing to do with the 1529 protestation at Speyer which coined the term Protestant. In particular, the Utraquists were eventually accommodated as a separate Catholic rite by the papacy after a military attempt to end their movement failed. On the other hand, the surviving Waldensians ended up joining Reformed Protestantism, so it is not completely inaccurate to refer to their movement as Protestant.

 Hussites
 Czechoslovak Hussite Church
 Moravian Church
 Unity of the Brethren
 Waldensians
 Waldensian Evangelical Church

Lutheran

Lutherans are a major branch of Protestantism, identifying with the theology of Martin Luther, a German friar, ecclesiastical reformer, and theologian. Lutheranism initially began as an attempt to reform the Catholic Church before the excommunication of its members. Today with most Protestants, Lutherans are divided among mainline and evangelical theological lines. The whole of Lutheranism had about 70-90 million members in 2018. The largest non-United Lutheran denomination was the Ethiopian Evangelical Church Mekane Yesus, an Eastern Protestant Christian group.

 Augustana Catholic Church (defunct 2020)
 Apostolic Lutheran Church of America
 Association of Free Lutheran Congregations
 Church of the Lutheran Brethren of America
 Church of the Lutheran Confession
 Concordia Lutheran Conference
 Confessional Evangelical Lutheran Conference
 Confessional Evangelical Lutheran Church of Albania
 Evangelical Lutheran Church "Concord"
 Evangelical Lutheran Free Church (Germany)
 Evangelical Lutheran Synod
 Lutheran Church of Central Africa Malawi Conference
 Lutheran Church of Central Africa Zambia Conference
 Lutheran Confessional Church
 Ukrainian Lutheran Church
 Wisconsin Evangelical Lutheran Synod
 Evangelical Community Church-Lutheran
 Evangelical Lutheran Diocese of North America
 Evangelical Lutheran Church in the Kingdom of the Netherlands
 General Lutheran Church
 International Lutheran Council
 American Association of Lutheran Churches
 Evangelical Lutheran Church of Brazil
 Evangelical Lutheran Church of England
 Evangelical Lutheran Church - Synod of France and Belgium
 Gutnius Lutheran Church
 Independent Evangelical-Lutheran Church
 Japan Lutheran Church
 Lanka Lutheran Church
 Lutheran Church—Canada
 Lutheran Church—Hong Kong Synod
 Lutheran Church–Missouri Synod
 Lutheran Church of Australia
 Kosovo Protestant Evangelical Church
 Laestadian Lutheran Church
 Latvian Evangelical Lutheran Church in America
 Lutheran Church - International
 Lutheran Church of China
 Lutheran Congregations in Mission for Christ
 Lutheran Evangelical Protestant Church
 Lutheran Ministerium and Synod - USA
 Lutheran World Federation
 Andhra Evangelical Lutheran Church
 Arcot Lutheran Church
 Batak Christian Protestant Church
 Church of Denmark
 Church of the Faroe Islands
 Church of Iceland
 Church of Norway
 Church of Sweden
 Estonian Evangelical Lutheran Church
 Evangelical Church of the Augsburg Confession in Slovakia
 Evangelical Church of the Lutheran Confession in Brazil
 Evangelical Lutheran Church in America
 Evangelical Lutheran Church in Canada
 Evangelical Lutheran Church in Italy
 Evangelical Lutheran Church in Madhya Pradesh
 Evangelical Lutheran Church in Southern Africa
 Evangelical Lutheran Church in Tanzania
 Evangelical Lutheran Church in the Himalayan States
 Evangelical Lutheran Church of Finland
 Evangelical Lutheran Church of Latvia
 Evangelical Lutheran Church of Papua New Guinea
 Evangelical Lutheran Free Church of Norway
 Gossner Evangelical Lutheran Church in Chotanagpur and Assam
 Indian Evangelical Lutheran Church
 Jeypore Evangelical Lutheran Church
 Lutheran Church of Australia
 Malagasy Lutheran Church
 Northern Evangelical Lutheran Church
 Simalungun Protestant Christian Church
 South Andhra Lutheran Church
 Tamil Evangelical Lutheran Church
 North American Lutheran Church
 Old Apostolic Lutheran Church

Pietism

Pietism was an influential movement in Lutheranism that combined its emphasis on Biblical doctrine with the Reformed emphasis on individual piety and living a vigorous Christian life. Pietists who separated from established Lutheran churches to form their own denominations are known as Radical Pietists. Although a movement in Lutheranism, influence on Anglicanism, in particular John Wesley, led to the spawning of the Methodist movement. 

 Amana Society
 Bible Fellowship Church
 Temple Society (Templers)
 United Christian Church

Reformed

Calvinism, also known as the Reformed tradition or Reformed Protestantism is a movement which broke from the Catholic Church in the 16th century. Calvinism follows the theological traditions set down by John Calvin, John Knox and other Reformation-era theologians. Calvinists differ from Lutherans on the real presence of Christ in the Eucharist, theories of worship, and the use of God's law for believers, among other things. There are from 60 to 80 million Christians identifying as Reformed or Calvinist according to statistics gathered in 2018.

Continental Reformed churches

 Afrikaans Protestant Church
 Canadian and American Reformed Churches
 Christian Reformed Church in North America
 Christian Reformed Church in Sierra Leone
 Christian Reformed Church in South Africa
 Christian Reformed Church of Nigeria
 Christian Reformed Churches
 Continued Reformed Churches in the Netherlands
 Christian Reformed Churches of Australia
 Communion of Reformed Evangelical Churches
 Dutch Reformed Church
 Dutch Reformed Church in Botswana
 Dutch Reformed Church in South Africa - NG Church
 Evangelical and Reformed Church in Honduras
 Evangelical Reformed Church in Bavaria and Northwestern Germany
 Evangelical Reformed Church of Christ
 Federation of Swiss Protestant Churches
 Free Reformed Churches of Australia
 Free Reformed Churches of North America
 Free Reformed Churches of South Africa
 Heritage Reformed Congregations
 Huguenot (Historical)
 Lithuanian Evangelical Reformed Church
 National Union of Independent Reformed Evangelical Churches of France
 Netherlands Reformed Churches
 Netherlands Reformed Congregations
 Nigeria Reformed Church
 Orthodox Christian Reformed Church
 Polish Reformed Church
 Protestant Church in the Netherlands
 Protestant Reformed Christian Church in Croatia
 Protestant Reformed Church of Luxembourg
 Protestant Reformed Churches in America
 Reformed Christian Church in Croatia
 Reformed Christian Church in Serbia
 Reformed Church in America
 Reformed Church in Austria
 Reformed Church in Hungary
 Reformed Church in Latvia
 Reformed Church in Romania
 Reformed Church in Transcarpathia
 Reformed Church in the United States
 Reformed Church of Christ in Nigeria
 Reformed Church of East Africa
 Reformed Church of France
 Reformed Churches in the Netherlands
 Reformed Churches in the Netherlands (Liberated)
 Reformed Churches of New Zealand
 Reformed Evangelical Church in Myanmar
 Reformed Synod of Denmark
 Restored Reformed Church
 United Church of Christ
 United Reformed Church
 United Reformed Church in Congo
 United Reformed Churches in North America
 Uniting Reformed Church in Southern Africa

Presbyterianism

 Africa Evangelical Presbyterian Church
 Associate Reformed Presbyterian Church
 Associate Reformed Presbyterian Church of Mexico
 Bible Presbyterian Church
 Church of Central Africa Presbyterian
 Church of Scotland
 Christian Evangelical Church in Minahasa
 Communion of Reformed Evangelical Churches
 Conservative Presbyterian Church in Brazil
 Costa Rican Evangelical Presbyterian Church
 Covenant Presbyterian Church
 Cumberland Presbyterian Church
 Cumberland Presbyterian Church in America
 Evangelical Covenant Order of Presbyterians
 Evangelical Presbyterian Church (Australia)
 Evangelical Presbyterian Church in England and Wales
 Evangelical Presbyterian Church, Ghana
 Evangelical Presbyterian Church of Malawi
 Evangelical Presbyterian Church of Ukraine
 Evangelical Presbyterian Church (United States)
 Free Church of Scotland
 Free Church of Scotland (Continuing)
 Free Presbyterian Church (Australia)
 Free Presbyterian Church of North America
 Free Presbyterian Church of Scotland
 Free Presbyterian Church of Ulster
 Fundamentalist Presbyterian Church in Brazil
 Grace Presbyterian Church of New Zealand
 Greek Evangelical Church
 National Presbyterian Church in Chile
 National Presbyterian Church in Mexico
 National Evangelical Presbyterian Church of Guatemala
 Orthodox Presbyterian Church
 Presbyterian Church in America
 Presbyterian Church in Canada
 Presbyterian Church in Chile
 Presbyterian Church in Honduras
 Presbyterian Church in Ireland
 Presbyterian Church in Korea (HapDong)
 Presbyterian Church in Korea (Koshin)
 Presbyterian Church in Korea (TongHap)
 Presbyterian Church in Liberia
 Presbyterian Church in Malaysia
 Presbyterian Church in Singapore
 Presbyterian Church in Sudan
 Presbyterian Church in Taiwan
 Presbyterian Church in Uganda
 Presbyterian Church of Africa
 Presbyterian Church of Aotearoa New Zealand
 Presbyterian Church of Australia
 Presbyterian Church of Belize
 Presbyterian Church of Brazil
 Presbyterian Church of East Africa
 Presbyterian Church of Eastern Australia
 Presbyterian Church of Ghana
 Presbyterian Church of India
 Presbyterian Church of Mozambique
 Presbyterian Church of Nigeria
 Presbyterian Church of Pakistan
 Presbyterian Church of the Philippines
 Presbyterian Church of Wales
 Presbyterian Church (USA)
 Presbyterian Reformed Church (Australia)
 Presbyterian Reformed Church (North America)
 Reformed Presbyterian Church General Assembly
 Reformed Presbyterian Church – Hanover Presbytery
 Reformed Presbyterian Church in the United States
 Reformed Presbyterian Church of Australia
 Reformed Presbyterian Church of Ireland
 Reformed Presbyterian Church of Malawi
 Reformed Presbyterian Church of North America
 Reformed Presbyterian Church of Scotland
 Renewed Presbyterian Church in Brazil
 Southern Presbyterian Church (Australia)
 Sudan Evangelical Presbyterian Church
 United Free Church of Scotland
 United Presbyterian Church of North America
 United Presbyterian Church of Pakistan
 Uniting Presbyterian Church in Southern Africa
 Upper Cumberland Presbyterian Church
 Westminster Presbyterian Church in the United States
 Westminster Presbyterian Church of Australia

Congregationalism

 Church of Niue
 Church of Tuvalu
 Congregational Christian Church in American Samoa
 Congregational Christian Church in Samoa
 Congregational Christian Churches in Canada
 Congregational Federation
 Congregational Federation of Australia
 Congregational Union of Ireland
 Congregational Union of New Zealand
 Conservative Congregational Christian Conference
 Cook Islands Christian Church
 English Independents
 Evangelical Congregational Church in Angola
 Evangelical Fellowship of Congregational Churches
 Fellowship of Congregational Churches  (Australia)
 Fellowship of Independent Evangelical Churches
 Huguenots
 Kiribati Protestant Church
 National Association of Congregational Christian Churches
 Nauru Congregational Church
 Reformed Congregational Churches
 Union of Evangelical Congregational Churches in Brazil
 Union of Evangelical Congregational Churches in Bulgaria
 United Church in the Solomon Islands
 United Church of Christ
 United Church of Christ-Congregational in the Marshall Islands
 United Congregational Church of Southern Africa

Anglican

Anglicanism or Episcopalianism has referred to itself as the via media between Roman Catholicism and Protestantism. The majority of Anglicans consider themselves part of the one, holy, catholic and apostolic Church within the Anglican Communion. Anglicans or Episcopalians also self-identify as both Catholic and Reformed. Although the use of the term "Protestant" to refer to Anglicans was once common, it is controversial today, with some rejecting the label and others accepting it. Anglicans numbered over 85 million in 2018.

Anglican Communion

 Anglican Church in Aotearoa, New Zealand and Polynesia
 Anglican Church in Central America
 Anglican Church in Japan
 Anglican Church of Australia
 Anglican Church of Bermuda
 Anglican Church of Canada
 Anglican Church of Kenya
 Anglican Church of Korea
 Anglican Church of Melanesia
 Anglican Church of Mexico
 Anglican Church of Papua New Guinea
 Anglican Church of South America
 Anglican Church of Southern Africa
 Anglican Church of Tanzania
 Anglican Episcopal Church of Brazil
 Church in the Province of the West Indies
 Church in Wales
 Church of Ceylon
 Church of England
 Church of Ireland
 Church of Nigeria
 Church of the Province of Central Africa
 Church of the Province of Myanmar
 Church of the Province of South East Asia
 Church of the Province of the Indian Ocean
 Church of the Province of West Africa
 Church of Uganda
 Episcopal Church (United States)
 Episcopal Church in Jerusalem and the Middle East
 Episcopal Church in the Philippines
 Episcopal Church of Cuba
 Hong Kong Anglican Church
 Lusitanian Catholic Apostolic Evangelical Church
 Parish of the Falkland Islands
 Province of the Anglican Church of Burundi
 Province of the Anglican Church of Rwanda
 Province of the Anglican Church of the Congo
 Province of the Episcopal Church of South Sudan
 Province of the Episcopal Church of Sudan
 Scottish Episcopal Church
 Spanish Reformed Episcopal Church

United and uniting churches which hold membership in the Anglican Communion

 Church of Bangladesh
 Church of North India
 Church of Pakistan
 Church of South India
 Mar Thoma Syrian Church (Protestant Eastern Christian denomination in full communion with the Anglican Communion)

Other Anglican churches and Continuing Anglican movement

There are numerous churches following the Anglican tradition that are not in full communion with the Anglican Communion. Some churches split due to changes in the Book of Common Prayer and the ordination of women, forming Anglo-Catholic or Evangelical Anglican communities. A select few of these churches are recognized by certain individual provinces of the Anglican Communion.

 African Orthodox Church
 Anglican Catholic Church
 Anglican Church in America
 Anglican Church in Brazil
 Anglican Church in North America
 Anglican Church of India
 Anglican Episcopal Church (USA)
 Anglican Mission in the Americas
 Anglican Orthodox Church
 Anglican Province of America
 Anglican Province of Christ the King
 Christian Episcopal Church
 Church of England (Continuing)
 Church of England in South Africa
 Communion of Evangelical Episcopal Churches
 Diocese of the Great Lakes
 Diocese of the Holy Cross
 Episcopal Missionary Church
 Free Church of England
 Free Protestant Episcopal Church
 Independent Anglican Church Canada Synod
 Orthodox Anglican Church
 Reformed Episcopal Church
 Southern Episcopal Church
 United Episcopal Church of North America

Anabaptist

The Anabaptists trace their origins to the Radical Reformation. Alternative to other early Protestants, Anabaptists were seen as an early offshoot of Protestantism, although the view has been challenged by some Anabaptists. There were approximately 2.1 million Anabaptists as of 2015.
 Abecedarians
 Amish 
 Amish Mennonite
 Beachy Amish
 Kauffman Amish Mennonite
 Nebraska Amish
 New Order Amish
 Old Order Amish
 Swartzentruber Amish
 Apostolic Christian Church
 Charity Christian Fellowship
 Church of the United Brethren in Christ
 Hutterites
 Dariusleut
 Lehrerleut
 Schmiedeleut
 Bruderhof
 Mennonites
 Alliance of Mennonite Evangelical Congregations
 Biblical Mennonite Alliance
 Canadian Conference of Mennonite Brethren Churches
 Chortitzer Mennonite Conference
 Church of God in Christ, Mennonite (Holdeman Mennonites)
 Conference of the Mennonite Brethren Churches in India
 Conservative Mennonite Conference
 Evangelical Mennonite Church
 Evangelical Mennonite Conference
 Evangelical Mennonite Mission Conference
 Evangelical Missionary Church
 Fellowship of Evangelical Bible Churches
 Japan Mennonite Brethren Conference
 Kleine Gemeinde
 Markham-Waterloo Mennonite Conference
 Mennonite Brethren Churches
 Mennonite Church Canada
 Mennonite Church in the Netherlands
 Mennonite Church USA
 Mennonite World Conference
 Missionary Church
 Noah Hoover Mennonite
 Ohio Wisler Mennonite
 Old Order Mennonites
 Reformed Mennonite
 Swiss Mennonite Conference
 US Conference of Mennonite Brethren Churches
 River Brethren
 Brethren in Christ Church
 Old Order River Brethren
 United Zion Church
 Wengerites
 Schwenkfelders

Schwarzenau Brethren Movement

 The Brethren Church (Ashland Brethren)
 Church of the Brethren
 Conservative Grace Brethren Churches, International
 Dunkard Brethren
 Ephrata Cloister
 Fellowship of Grace Brethren Churches
 Old Brethren
 Old Brethren German Baptist
 Old German Baptist Brethren
 Old German Baptist Brethren, New Conference
 Old Order German Baptist Brethren

Baptist

Baptists emerged as the English Puritans were influenced by the Anabaptists, and along with Methodism, grew in size and influence after they sailed to the New World (the remaining Puritans who traveled to the New World were Congregationalists). Some Baptists fit strongly with the Reformed tradition theologically but not denominationally. Some Baptists also adopt presbyterian and episcopal forms of governance. In 2018, there were about 75-105 million Baptists.

 All-Ukrainian Union of Churches of Evangelical Christian Baptists
 Alliance of Baptists
 American Baptist Association
 American Baptist Churches USA
 Association of Baptist Churches in Ireland
 Association of Reformed Baptist Churches of America
 Association of Regular Baptist Churches
 Baptist Bible Fellowship International
 Baptist Church of Christ
 Baptist Conference of the Philippines
 Baptist Convention of Ontario and Quebec
 Baptist Convention of Western Cuba
 Baptist Evangelical Christian Union of Italy
 Baptist General Conference of Canada
 Baptist General Convention of Texas
 Baptist General Conference (Sweden)
 Baptist Missionary Association of America
 Baptist Union of Australia
 Baptist Union of Great Britain
 Baptist Union of New Zealand
 Baptist Union of Scotland
 Baptist Union of Western Canada
 Canadian Baptist Ministries
 Canadian Convention of Southern Baptists
 Central Baptist Association
 Central Canada Baptist Conference
 Christian Unity Baptist Association
 Conservative Baptist Association
 Conservative Baptist Association of America
 Continental Baptist Churches
 Convención Nacional Bautista de Mexico
 Convention of Atlantic Baptist Churches
 Convention of Baptist Churches of Northern Circars
 Cooperative Baptist Fellowship
 Council of Baptist Churches in Northeast India
 Council of Baptist Churches in Northern India
 European Baptist Federation
 Evangelical Baptist Mission of South Haiti
 Fellowship of Evangelical Baptist Churches in Canada
 Free Will Baptist Church
 Fundamental Baptist Fellowship of America
 General Association of Baptists
 General Association of General Baptists
 General Association of Regular Baptist Churches
 General Baptists
 General Conference of the Evangelical Baptist Church, Inc.
 General Six-Principle Baptists
 Independent Baptist
 Independent Baptist Church of America
 Independent Baptist Fellowship International
 Independent Baptist Fellowship of North America
 Interstate & Foreign Landmark Missionary Baptist Association
 International Baptist Convention
 Landmark Baptist Church
 Liberty Baptist Fellowship
 Manipur Baptist Convention
 Myanmar Baptist Convention
 Nagaland Baptist Church Council
 National Association of Free Will Baptists
 National Baptist Convention of America, Inc.
 National Baptist Convention, USA, Inc.
 National Baptist Evangelical Life and Soul Saving Assembly of the U.S.A.
 National Missionary Baptist Convention of America
 National Primitive Baptist Convention of the U.S.A.
 New England Evangelical Baptist Fellowship
 New Independent Fundamentalist Baptist
 Faithful Word Baptist Church
 Nigerian Baptist Convention
 North American Baptist Conference
 North Bank Baptist Christian Association
 Norwegian Baptist Union
 Old Baptist Union
 Old Regular Baptist
 Old Time Missionary Baptist
 Primitive Baptist
 Primitive Baptist Universalism
 Progressive Baptist
 Progressive National Baptist Convention
 Reformed Baptist
 Regular Baptist
 Regular Baptist Churches, General Association of
 Russian Union of Evangelical Christians-Baptists
 Samavesam of Telugu Baptist Churches
 Separate Baptist
 Separate Baptists in Christ
 Social Brethren
 Southeast Conservative Baptist
 Southern Baptist Convention
 Southern Baptists of Texas
 Sovereign Grace Baptists
 Strict Baptists or Particular Baptists
 Two-Seed-in-the-Spirit Predestinarian Baptists
 Union d'Églises baptistes françaises au Canada
 Union of Evangelical Christians-Baptists in Serbia and Montenegro
 United American Free Will Baptist Church
 United American Free Will Baptist Conference
 United Baptist
 United Baptist Convention of the Atlantic Provinces
 United Free Will Baptist
 World Baptist Fellowship

Bapticostals
 Bapticostal movement
 Nazareth Baptist Church

Holiness Baptists
 Christian Baptist Church of God
 Holiness Baptist Association

Sabbath-keeping Baptists
 Seventh Day Baptists

Spiritual Baptists
 Spiritual Baptist

Methodist

The Methodist movement emerged out the influence of Pietism within Anglicanism. Unlike Baptists (also emerging from the Church of England), Methodists have retained liturgical worship and other historic Anglican practices including vestments and (in some Methodist denominations such as the United Methodist Church) the episcopacy. Methodists were some of the first Christians to accept women's ordination since the Montanists. Some 60-80 million Christians are Methodists and members of the World Methodist Council.

 African Methodist Episcopal Church
 African Methodist Episcopal Zion Church
 British Methodist Episcopal Church
 Christian Methodist Episcopal Church
 Congregational Methodist Church
 Evangelical Church of the Dominican Republic
 Evangelical Methodist Church
 First Congregational Methodist Church
 Free Methodist Church
 Global Methodist Church
 Liberation Methodist Connexion
 Methodist Church of Fiji and Rotuma
 Methodist Church of Great Britain
 Methodist Church of Malaysia
 Methodist Church in India
 Methodist Church of New Zealand
 Methodist Church of Southern Africa
 Primitive Methodist Church
 Southern Methodist Church
 United Methodist Church
 Wesleyan Methodist Church of Australia

Holiness movement

The Holiness movement  emerged from 19th-century Methodism. , churches of the movement had an estimated 12 million adherents.

 Free Methodist Church
 Christ's Sanctified Holy Church
 Church of Christ (Holiness) U.S.A.
 Church of God (Anderson, Indiana)
 Church of God (Holiness)
 Church of God (Restoration)
 Church of the Nazarene
 The Salvation Army
 Wesleyan Methodist Church

Campbellite and Millerite

 Adventism was a result from the Restoration movement, which sought to restore Christianity along the lines of what was known about the apostolic early Church which Restorationists saw as the search for a more pure and ancient form of the religion. This idea is also called Christian Primitivism. Following the Stone-Campbell Restoration Movement, William Miller preached the end of the world and the second coming of Christ in 1843/44. Some followers after the failed prediction became the Adventists or Campbellites, while other splinter groups eventually became Apocalyptic Restorationists. Many of the splinter groups did not subscribe to trinitarian theologies. Well known Restorationist groups related in some way to Millerism include the Jehovah's Witnesses, World Mission Society Church of God, the Restored Church of God, and the Kingdom of Jesus Christ. There are a little over 7 million Restorationist Christians.

Stone-Campbell Restoration movement 

 Christian Church (Disciples of Christ)
 Churches of Christ
 Churches of Christ (non-institutional)
 Churches of Christ in Australia
 Evangelical Christian Church in Canada (Christian Disciples)
 Independent Christian Churches/Churches of Christ
 International Christian Church
 International Churches of Christ

Millerism and comparable groups

 Millerites

Adventist movement (Sunday observing) 

 Advent Christian Church
 Church of the Blessed Hope
 Church of God General Conference

Adventist movement (Seventh Day Sabbath/Saturday observing)
Original denominations

 Church of God (Seventh-Day)
 Seventh-day Adventist Church 

Splinter denominations

 Adventist Church of Promise
 Charismatic Adventism
 Creation Seventh Day Adventist Church
 Sabbath Rest Advent Church
 Seventh Day Adventist Reform Movement
 International Missionary Society of Seventh-Day Adventist Church Reform Movement
 True and Free Seventh-day Adventists
 Shepherd's Rod
 Branch Davidians 
 United Sabbath-Day Adventist Church
 United Seventh-Day Brethren

Quaker

Quakers, or Friends, are members of various movements united by their belief in the ability of each human being to experientially access the light within, or "that of God in every person".
 Conservative Friends
 Friends United Meeting
 Evangelical Friends Church International
 Friends General Conference
 New Foundation Fellowship

Shakers
 Shakers

Plymouth Brethren
Plymouth Brethren is a conservative, low church, non-conformist, evangelical Christian movement whose history can be traced to Dublin, Ireland, in the late 1820s, originating from Anglicanism.
 Exclusive Brethren
 Indian Brethren
 Kerala Brethren Assembly
 Open Brethren
 Church Assembly Hall, one of the Chinese Independent Churches
 Gospel Hall Brethren or Gospel Hall Assemblies
 Needed Truth Brethren or The Churches of God

Irvingist

The Catholic Apostolic churches were born out of the 1830s revival started in London by the teachings of Edward Irving, and out of the resultant Catholic Apostolic Church movement.

 Catholic Apostolic Church
 New Apostolic Church
 United Apostolic Church
 Old Apostolic Church
 Restored Apostolic Mission Church

Pentecostal and Charismatic

Pentecostalism and Charismatic Christianity began in the 1900s. The two movements emphasize direct personal experience of God through baptism with the Holy Spirit. They represent some of the largest growing movements in Protestant Christianity. As a result of the two movements, the Catholic Charismatic Renewal was established. According to the Pew Research Center, Pentecostals and Charismatics numbered some 280 million people in 2011.
 Alamo Christian Foundation
 Apostolic Church (denomination)
 Apostolic Faith Church
 Apostolic Faith Mission of South Africa
 Apostolic Overcoming Holy Church of God
 Apostolic Pastoral Congress
 Assemblies of God
 Associated Brotherhood of Christians
 C3 Church Global
 Celestial Church of Christ
 Charisma Christian Church
 Christ Gospel Churches International
 Christian Assemblies International
 Christian Church of North America
 Christian Congregation in the United States
 Christian Open Door Church
 Church of God by Faith
 Church of God (Charleston, Tennessee)
 Church of God (Chattanooga)
 Church of God (Cleveland, Tennessee)
 The Church of God for All Nations
 Church of God (Full Gospel) in India
 Church of God, House of Prayer
 Church of God (Huntsville, Alabama)
 Church of God in Christ
 Church of God (Jerusalem Acres)
 Church of God Mountain Assembly
 Church of God of Prophecy
 Church of God of the Original Mountain Assembly
 Church of God of the Union Assembly
 Church of God with Signs Following
 Congregational Holiness Church
 CRC Churches International
 Deeper Life Bible Church
 Destiny Church
 Elim Pentecostal Church
 Evangelical Pentecostal Church of Besançon
 The Foursquare Church
 Free Apostolic Church of Pentecost
 Fire Baptized Holiness Church of God of the Americas
 God is Love Pentecostal Church
 Hillsong Church
 Independent Assemblies of God, International
 Indian Pentecostal Church of God
 International Assemblies of God Fellowship
 International Fellowship of Christian Assemblies
 International Pentecostal Holiness Church
 International Pentecostal Church of Christ
 Mount Sinai Holy Church of America
 New Life Churches
 Open Bible Standard Churches
 Pentecostal Assemblies of Canada
 Pentecostal Assemblies of God of America
 Pentecostal Church of God
 Pentecostal Free Will Baptist Church
 The Pentecostal Mission
 Potter's House Christian Fellowship
 Redeemed Christian Church of God
 Revival Centres International
 The Revival Fellowship
 Soldiers of the Cross Church
 United Gospel Tabernacles
 United Holy Church of America
 United House of Prayer For All People
 The Wesleyan Church

Other Charismatic movements

 Calvary Chapel
 Charismatic Episcopal Church
 City Harvest Church
 Every Nation
 International Christian Fellowship
 Jesus Army
 Ministries Without Borders
 Sovereign Grace Church

Neo-charismatic movement

 Association of Vineyard Churches
 Bible Christian Mission
 Born Again Movement
 Christ Embassy
 Church on the Rock- International
 Destiny Church Groningen
 New Life Fellowship Association
 Newfrontiers
 El Lugar de Su Presencia

Uniting and united

These united or uniting churches are the result of a merger between distinct denominational churches (e.g., Lutherans and Calvinists). As ecumenism progresses, unions between various Protestants are becoming more and more common, resulting in a growing number of united and uniting churches. Major examples of uniting churches are the United Protestant Church of France (2013) and the Protestant Church in the Netherlands (2004). Churches are listed here when their disparate heritage marks them as inappropriately listed in the particular categories above.

 China Christian Council
 Christian and Missionary Alliance
 Evangelical Association of Reformed and Congregational Christian Churches
 Church of Bangladesh (Anglican)
 Church of North India (Anglican)
 Church of Pakistan (Anglican)
 Church of South India (Anglican)
 Evangelical Church in Germany
 Evangelical Church of Czech Brethren
 Federation of Evangelical Churches in Italy
 Kiribati Uniting Church (former Congressionalists)
 Protestant Church in the Netherlands
 St. Thomas Evangelical Church of India
 Union of Methodist and Waldensian Churches
 United Church in Jamaica and the Cayman Islands
 United Church in Papua New Guinea and the Solomon Islands
 United Church of Canada
 United Church of Christ
 United Church of Christ in Japan
 United Church of Christ in the Philippines
 Uniting Church in Australia
 United Protestant Church of France

Free Evangelical Churches
 Free Evangelical Churches

Evangelical 
 The term Evangelical appears with the reformation and reblossoms in the 18th century and in the 19th century. Evangelical Protestantism modernly understood is an inter-denominational Protestant movement which maintains the belief that the essence of the Gospel consists of the doctrine of salvation by grace through faith in Jesus Christ's atonement.

African Evangelicalism

 Evangelical Church of West Africa

P'ent'ay 

P'ent'ay, simply known as Ethiopian-Eritrean Evangelicalism are a group of indigenous Protestant Eastern Baptist, Lutheran, Pentecostal, and Mennonite denominations in full communion with each other and believe that Ethiopian and Eritrean Evangelicalism are the reformation of the current Orthodox Tewahedo churches as well as the restoration of it to original Ethiopian Christianity. They uphold that in order for a person to be saved one has to accept Jesus as their Lord and Savior for the forgiveness of sins; and to receive Christ one must be "born again". Its members make up a significant portion of the 2 million Eastern Protestant tradition.

 Kale Heywet (Word of Life) Church
 Ethiopian Evangelical Church Mekane Yesus (Place of Jesus)
 Mulu Wongel (Full Gospel Believers) Church
 Meserete Kristos (Christ Foundation) Church
 Assembly of God

Asian-initiated churches
Asian-initiated churches are those arising from Chinese and Japanese regions that were formed during repression in authoritarian eras as responses from government crackdowns of their old Christian denominations which were deemed illegal or unrecognized in their countries' state atheism or religion.

Chinese Independent Churches

 Evangelical Free Church of China
 Local Church movement

Japanese Independent Churches

 Non-church movement
 Zion Christian Church (Japan)

Malaysian Evangelicalism
 Borneo Evangelical Church (SIb Malaysia)

North American Evangelicalism

 Evangelical Free Church of Canada

South American Evangelicalism
 Evangelical Lutheran Church of São Paulo
 Evangelical Church of the River Plate
 Evangelical Presbyterian and Reformed Church in Peru

Internet churches

 LifeChurch.tv

Eastern Protestant

These churches resulted from a post–1800s reformation of Eastern Christianity, in line with Protestant beliefs and practices.

 Evangelical Orthodox Church
 Mar Thoma Syrian Church
 St. Thomas Evangelical Church of India

Other Protestant churches and movements
These are denominations, movements, and organizations deriving from mainstream Protestantism but are not classifiable under historic or current Protestant movements nor as parachurch organizations.

 Associated Gospel Churches of Canada (AGC)
 Believers' Church in India
 Believers Eastern Church
 Brunstad Christian Church
 The Christian Community
 Church of Christ, Instrumental (Kelleyites)
 Cooneyites (not to be confused with Christian Conventions, above)
 Evangelical Covenant Church of America (Swedish Evangelical Mission Covenant)
 Evangelical Free Church of America
 Family International
 Fellowship of Fundamental Bible Churches
 Fellowship of Independent Evangelical Churches
 Gloriavale Christian Community
 Grace Movement Churches
 Great Commission Association
 Indian Shakers
 Inspirationalists (Amana Church Society)
 Jesus Movement
 Local Churches
 Methernitha
 Metropolitan Community Churches
 Shiloh Youth Revival Centers
 Universal Life
 Universal Alliance
 The Way International
 The African Church
 Apostles of Johane Maranke
 Christ Apostolic Church
 Church of the Lord (Aladura)
 Eternal Sacred Order of Cherubim and Seraphim
 Kimbanguist Church
 Zion Christian Church

Early modern England
 Nonconformist / English Dissenters

Independent sacramental 
Independent sacramental churches refer to a loose collection of individuals and Christian denominations who are not part of the historic sacramental Christian denominations (such as the Roman Catholic, Anglican, and Orthodox churches) and yet continue to practice the historic sacramental rites independently while utilizing "Old Catholic", "Catholic", or "Autocephalous Orthodox" labels. Many such groups originated from schisms of these larger denominations, and they claim to have preserved the historical episcopate or apostolic succession, though such claims are frequently disputed or rejected outright by the historic churches of Rome, Constantinople, the Old Catholic Union of Utrecht, and the Church of England.

Independent Catholic 

Independent Catholic churches arguably began in 1724. The Independent Catholic churches self-identify as either Western or Eastern Catholic although they are not affiliated with or recognized by the Catholic Church.

 American Catholic Church in the United States
 American National Catholic Church
 Antiochian Catholic Church in America
 Augustana Catholic Church
 Argentine Catholic Apostolic Church
 Apostolic Catholic Church (Philippines)
 Brazilian Catholic Apostolic Church
 Catholic Christian Church
 Catholic Mariavite Church
 Chinese Patriotic Catholic Association
 Christ Catholic Church
 Community of the Lady of All Nations
 Congregation of Mary Immaculate Queen
 Ecumenical Catholic Church
 Ecumenical Catholic Communion
 Evangelical Catholic Church (Independent Catholic)
 Fraternité Notre-Dame
 Free Catholic Church, in Germany
 Imani Temple African-American Catholic Congregation
 Istituto Mater Boni Consilii
 Liberal Catholic Church
 Mariavite Church (not to be confused with the Catholic Mariavite Church)
 Most Holy Family Monastery
 Old Catholic Church
 Old Catholic Apostolic Church
 Old Catholic Mariavite Church
 Old Roman Catholic Church in Great Britain
 Palmarian Catholic Church
 Philippine Independent Church (Aglipayan Church)
 Polish National Catholic Church
 Rabelados
 Reformed Catholic Church, in Venezuela
 St. Stanislaus Kostka Church (St. Louis, Missouri)
 Society of St. Pius V
 Traditionalist Mexican-American Catholic Church
 True Catholic Church
 Ukrainian Orthodox Greek Catholic Church
 Venezuelan Catholic Apostolic Church

Independent Eastern Orthodox 

These churches consider themselves Eastern Orthodox but are not in communion with the main bodies of Eastern Orthodoxy. Some of these denominations consider themselves as part of True Orthodoxy or the Old Believers.

 Abkhazian Orthodox Church
 American Orthodox Catholic Church
 Autocephalous Turkish Orthodox Patriarchate
 Belarusian Autocephalous Orthodox Church
 Latvian Orthodox Church
 Lusitanian Catholic Orthodox Church
 Montenegrin Orthodox Church (1993)
 Orthodox Church in Italy
 Independent Ukrainian Orthodox churches:
 Ukrainian Autocephalous Orthodox Church Canonical
 Ukrainian Orthodox Church (Moscow Patriarchate)
 Ukrainian Orthodox Church – Kyiv Patriarchate

True Orthodoxy 

True Orthodoxy, or Genuine Orthodoxy, is a movement of Eastern Orthodox churches that separated from the mainstream Eastern Orthodox Church over issues of ecumenism and calendar reform since the 1920s.

 Old Calendar Bulgarian Orthodox Church
 Old Calendar Romanian Orthodox Church
 Russian Orthodox Autonomous Church
 Serbian True Orthodox Church

Old Believers

Russian Old Believers refused to accept the liturgical and ritual changes made by Patriarch Nikon of Moscow between 1652 and 1666. Several Old Believer denominations have reunified with the Russian Orthodox Church and subsequent wider Eastern Orthodox communion.

 Russian Orthodox Old-Rite Church (Belokrinitskaya)
 Lipovan Orthodox Old-Rite Church (Belokrinitskaya)
 Russian Old-Orthodox Church (Novozybkovskaya)
 Pomorian Old-Orthodox Church (Pomortsy)

Independent Oriental Orthodox 

Those are churches which claim to be Oriental Orthodox, but are not in communion with the main Oriental Orthodox churches.
 British Orthodox Church
 Malabar Independent Syrian Church

Syncretic Orthodoxy 
Syncretic Orthodox churches blend with other denominations outside of Eastern Orthodoxy and are not in communion with the main body of Eastern nor Oriental Orthodoxies. These bodies may also be considered part of Eastern Protestant Christianity or the Convergence Movement.

 Evangelical Orthodox Church
 Communion of Western Orthodox Churches
 Celtic Orthodox Church
 French Orthodox Church
 Orthodox Church of the Gauls
 Antiochian Catholic Church in America
 Orthodox-Catholic Church of America

Miscellaneous
The following are independent and non-mainstream movements, denominations and organizations formed during various times in the history of Christianity by splitting from mainline Catholicism, Eastern or Oriental Orthodoxy, or Protestantism not classified in the previous lists.

Independent Russian

 Doukhobors
 Imiaslavie (Onomatodoxy)
 Inochentism

Southcottist

 Christian Israelite Church
 House of David (commune)
 Panacea Society

Christian Identitist 

 Christian Identity
 Assembly of Christian Soldiers
 Church of Israel, Schell City, Missouri
 Church of Jesus Christ–Christian (Aryan Nations)
 The Covenant, The Sword, and the Arm of the Lord
 Kingdom Identity Ministries, Harrison, Arkansas
 LaPorte Church of Christ, Fort Collins, Colorado

Independent/Isolated

 House of Aaron
 Holy Spirit Association for the Unification of World Christianity (HSA-UWC/Unification Church/Unification Movement)
 Sanban Puren Pai
 The Process Church of The Final Judgment
 Trinitarian Universalism
 Brotherhood Church
 United House of Prayer for All People
 Lord’s Resistance Army
 Mita Congregation (USA / Puerto Rico)
 Olive Tree and related South Korean New Religious Movements such as Shincheonji and Victory Altar
 Taiping Heavenly Kingdom
 Twelve Tribes communities
 Westboro Baptist Church

Nontrinitarian

These groups or organizations diverge from historic trinitarian theology (usually based on the Council of Nicaea) with different interpretations of Nontrinitarianism.

Oneness Pentecostalism 

 Apostolic Assemblies of Christ
 Apostolic Assembly of the Faith in Christ Jesus
 Apostolic Church of Pentecost
 Apostolic Gospel Church of Jesus Christ
 Apostolic Overcoming Holy Church of God
 Assemblies of the Lord Jesus Christ
 Bible Way Church of Our Lord Jesus Christ
 Church of Our Lord Jesus Christ of the Apostolic Faith
 Pentecostal Assemblies of the World
 Pentecostal Churches of Christ
 True Jesus Church
 United Pentecostal Church International

Unitarian and Universalism

 American Unitarian Association (consolidated with the Universalist Church of America to form the Unitarian Universalist Association and Unitarian Universalism)
 Unitarian Universalist Christian Fellowship
 American Unitarian Conference
 International Council of Unitarians and Universalists
 General Assembly of Unitarian and Free Christian Churches
 Unitarian Christian Association
 Unitarian Church of Transylvania
 Unitarisk Kirkesamfund
 Polish Brethren
 Socinianism
 Unitarian Christian Conference USA
 Unitarian Christian Emerging Church
 Universalist Church of America (consolidated with the American Unitarian Association to form the Unitarian Universalist Association and Unitarian Universalism)

Nontrinitarian Restorationism

Latter Day Saint movement

Most Latter Day Saint denominations are derived from the Church of Christ established by Joseph Smith in 1830. The largest worldwide denomination of this movement, and the one publicly recognized as Mormonism, is the Church of Jesus Christ of Latter-day Saints. Some sects, known as the "Prairie Saints", broke away because they did not recognize Brigham Young as the head of the church, and did not follow him West in the mid-1800s. Other sects broke away over the abandonment of practicing plural marriage after the 1890 Manifesto. Other denominations are defined by either a belief in Joseph Smith as a prophet or acceptance of the Book of Mormon as scripture. The Latter Day Saints comprise a little over 16 million members collectively.
 Church of Christ (Latter Day Saints)

"Prairie Saint" Latter Day Saints 

 Church of Christ (Temple Lot) (Hedrickites)
 Church of Christ with the Elijah Message
 The Church of Jesus Christ (Bickertonite)
 Church of Jesus Christ (Cutlerite)
 Church of Jesus Christ of Latter Day Saints (Strangite)
 Community of Christ
 Remnant Church of Jesus Christ of Latter Day Saints
 Independent RLDS / Restoration Branches
 Restoration Church of Jesus Christ of Latter Day Saints
 Restored Church of Jesus Christ (Eugene O. Walton)

"Rocky Mountain" Latter Day Saints 

 The Church of Jesus Christ of Latter-day Saints

Fundamentalist Rocky Mountain Latter Day Saints 

 Apostolic United Brethren
 Fundamentalist Church of Jesus Christ of Latter Day Saints (FLDS)
 Latter Day Church of Christ (Kingston Clan)
 The True and Living Church of Jesus Christ of Saints of the Last Days

Other Latter Day Saint denominations 

 Fellowships of the Remnant 
 Restoration Church of Jesus Christ (extinct)

British Israelism 
 Armstrongism (Worldwide Church of God)
 British-Israel-World Federation

Worldwide Church of God splinter groups 

 Church of God International (United States)
 Intercontinental Church of God 
 Living Church of God
 Philadelphia Church of God
 Restored Church of God
 United Church of God
 United Seventh-Day Brethren

Bible Students and splinter groups 

 Christian Millennial Fellowship
 Dawn Bible Students Association
 Friends of Man
 Jehovah's Witnesses
 Laymen's Home Missionary Movement
 Pastoral Bible Institute

Other Nontrinitarian restorationists 
 Iglesia ni Cristo (Church of Christ)
 Kingdom of Jesus Christ
 Jesus Miracle Crusade
 La Luz del Mundo
 Members Church of God International

Swedenborgianism

 General Church of the New Jerusalem
 Lord's New Church Which Is Nova Hierosolyma
 Swedenborgian Church of North America

Christian Science

 Church of Christ, Scientist
 Eschatology (religious movement)

Esoteric Christianity (Gnosticism)

 Anthroposophical Society
 Archeosophical Society
 Behmenism
 Ecclesia Gnostica
 Lectorium Rosicrucianum
 Martinism
 The Rosicrucian Fellowship
 Societas Rosicruciana
 Spiritualist Church
 Theosophy
 Universal White Brotherhood

Other Nontrinitarians

 Antoinism
 Christadelphians
 Church of the Blessed Hope
 Church of God (Seventh-Day)
 The Church of Almighty God
 Family Federation for World Peace and Unification
 World Peace and Unification Sanctuary Church
 Some Quakers
 Spiritual Christians from Russia
 Tolstoyan movement
 Two by Twos ("Christian Conventions")
 United Church of God
 Universal Alliance
 World Mission Society Church of God

Judeo-Christian

Messianic Judaism

 Chosen People Ministries
 Hebrew Christian movement
 International Messianic Jewish Alliance
 Jews for Jesus
 Messianic Jewish Alliance of America
 Union of Messianic Jewish Congregations

Black Hebrew Israelites

 African Hebrew Israelites of Jerusalem
 Beth Shalom
 Church of God and Saints of Christ
 Church of God and Saints of Christ (Orthodox Christianity)
 Commandment Keepers
 Israelite Church of God in Jesus Christ
 Israelite School of Universal Practical Knowledge
 Nation of Yahweh

Other groups

 Assemblies of Yahweh
 Hebrew Roots
 Makuya
 Sacred Name Movement
 Subbotniks
 Yehowists

Parachurch 

Parachurch organizations are Christian faith-based organizations that work outside and across denominations to engage in social welfare and evangelism. These organizations are not churches but work with churches or represent a coalition of churches.

 Action of Churches Together in Scotland
 Bose Monastic Community
 Byzantine Discalced Carmelites
 Campus Crusade for Christ
 Canadian Council of Churches
 Christian Churches Together in the USA
 Churches Together in Britain and Ireland
 Churches Together in England
 Churches Uniting in Christ
 Conference of European Churches
 Ecumenical Institute for Study and Dialogue
 Edinburgh Churches Together
 Fellowship of Saint Alban and Saint Sergius
 Intervarsity Christian Fellowship
 Iona Community
 National Council of the Churches of Christ in the U.S.A.
 New Independent Fundamentalist Baptist
 New Monasticism related Communities
 Pentecostal Charismatic Peace Fellowship
 Dicastery for Promoting Christian Unity
 Reasons to Believe
 Scripture Union
 Society of Ordained Scientists
 Stand to Reason
 Taizé Community
 The Gospel Coalition 
 World Alliance of Reformed Churches
 World Council of Churches
 World Evangelical Alliance
 World Student Christian Federation
 Young Life
 Youth for Christ
 Youth With A Mission

Ideologies

A Christian movement is a theological, political, or philosophical interpretation of Christianity that is not necessarily represented by a specific church, sect, or denomination.

 24-7 Prayer Movement
 Arianism
 Semi-Arianism
 Arminianism
 British Israelism
 British New Church Movement
 Calvinism
 Campbellism
 Charismatic movement
 Christian anarchism
 Christian atheism
 Christian communism
 Christian democracy
 Distributism
 Social Credit
 Christian existentialism
 Christian Family Movement
 Christian feminism
 Christian Identity (White Supremacist)
 Christian left
 Christian nationalism
 Christian naturism
 Christian pacifism
 Christian right
 Christian socialism
 Christian Torah-observance
 Christian vegetarianism
 Christian Zionism
 Confessing Church
 Confessing Movement
 Continual Prayer Movement
 Convergence Movement
 Countercult Movement
 Creationism
 Old Earth Creationism
 Young Earth Creationism
 Evolutionary creationism
 Neo-Creationism
 Intelligent design movement
 Emerging Church Movement
 Evangelicalism
 Gnosticism
 Green Christianity
 House church (or Simple church)
 Chinese house churches
 Jesus Movement
 Judaizers
 LGBT and Denominations
 Liberation theology
 Black
 Dalit
 Latin American 
 Palestinian
 Lutheranism
 Marcionism
 Millerism
 Neo-orthodoxy
 Neo-Charismatic
 Paleo-orthodoxy
 Pelagianism
 Semi-Pelagianism
 Positive Christianity (Nazi)
 German Christians (movement) (Nazi)
 Postmodern Christianity
 Progressive Christianity (Liberal Christianity)
 Prosperity Theology
 Queer theology
 Quiverfull
 Restorationism
 Shepherding Movement
 Wesleyanism

Syncretic

The relation of these movements to other Christian ideas can be remote. They are listed here because they include some elements of Christian practice or beliefs, within religious contexts which may be only loosely characterized as Christian.

African diaspora religions
African diaspora religions are a number of related religions that developed in the Americas in various nations of the Caribbean, Latin America and the Southern United States. They derive from traditional African religions with some influence from other religious traditions, notably Christianity and Islam. Examples incorporating elements of Christianity include but are not limited to:

 Candomblé
 Haitian Vodou
 Rastafari
 Santería
 Santo Daime
 Umbanda
 Voodoo

New Thought

The relation of New Thought to Christianity is not defined as exclusive; some of its adherents see themselves as solely practicing Christianity, while adherents of Religious Science say "yes and no" to the question of whether they consider themselves to be Christian in belief and practice, leaving it up to the individual to define oneself spiritually.

 Church of Divine Science
 Church of the Truth
 Home of Truth
 The Infinite Way
 Psychiana
 Religious Science
 Seicho-no-Ie
 Unity Church
 Universal Foundation for Better Living

Other syncretists
Other Christian or Christian-influenced syncretic traditions and movements include:

 Alleluia church
 Bwiti (Some sects)
 Burkhanism
 Cao Đài
 Chrislam
 Christopaganism
 Cults of many folk saints such as Santa Muerte and Maximón
 Dōkai
 Ghost Dance
 Kakure Kirishitans
 Longhouse Religion
 Mama Tata
 Modekngei
 Native American Church
 Pai Mārire and other syncretic Māori religions
 Pilgrims of Arès
 Pomio Kivung
 Some Rizalista religious movements

Historical movements with strong syncretic influence from Christianity but no active modern membership include

 Antonianism
 God Worshipping Society
 Pulahan

See also

 Denominationalism
 East–West Schism
 Eastern Christianity
 List of Christian denominations by number of members
 List of current Christian leaders
 List of the largest Protestant denominations
 List of religions and spiritual traditions
 List of religious organizations
 Timeline of Christianity
 Western Christianity

References